The Dasheri mango is a mango cultivar which originated in a village near Kakori in Lucknow district in 18th century. It is a sweet and fragrant variety of mango grown in North India, the southern state Andhra Pradesh, Nepal and Pakistan. Malihabad in Uttar Pradesh is the largest producer.

History

In the 18th century, the Dasheri first appeared in the gardens of the Nawab of Lucknow. Since then Dasheri plants have been produced and planted throughout India. People from the village of Dasheri near Kakori, Uttar Pradesh, have the mother plant. This mother plant belonged to the orchards of Mohammad Ansar Zaidi. This mother plant is said to be around 200 years old. It bears fruit every alternate year. Though the fruit is small when compared to its grafted counterparts, its flavour and aroma are unmatched. The plant is taken care of by Zaidi's descendants. It is often referred to as "the Mother Dasehri".

Exports
The Dasheri mango is exported internationally to various countries including Singapore, Hong Kong, The Philippines, Malaysia, and other countries in South-East Asia.

References 

 Dasheri Mango
 Dasheri Mango plant propagation
 Oldest Plant of Dasehri

External links 
 Dasheri Village
 Dasheri Mango's Mother Plant

Mango cultivars of India
Flora of the Indian subcontinent
Environment of Andhra Pradesh
Environment of Uttar Pradesh